HMS Ringdove was a  of the Royal Navy, built at Devonport Dockyard and launched on 30 April 1889.

She commenced service on the Australia Station on 5 March 1890, under the command of R. F. Ayscough. She left the Australia Station in February 1901 and returned to England, where she was paid off at Devonport 10 June 1901 and placed in the fleet reserve to be refit at Haulbowline. She became a tender to HMS Vernon and was converted into a salvage vessel in 1915 and was renamed HMS Melita.

Fate
She was sold to the Ship Salvage Corporation on 22 January 1920 and renamed Telima. She was broken up in 1926.

Citations

References
Bastock, John (1988), Ships on the Australia Station, Child & Associates Publishing Pty Ltd; Frenchs Forest, Australia. 

 

1889 ships
Victorian-era gunboats of the United Kingdom
Redbreast-class gunboats